Subjel is a village in the municipality of Kosjerić, western Serbia. According to the 2002 census, the village has a population of 219 people.

References

Populated places in Zlatibor District